Janet Elizabeth Macgregor,  (née McPherson; 12 January 1920 – 2005) was a Scottish physician and cytologist who pioneered the first successful screening trial programme for cervical cancer in the United Kingdom. Her work helped lead to a significant decrease in women's deaths from cervical cancer.

Early life and education
Janet Elizabeth McPherson was born at Lynedoch Place, Glasgow on 12 January 1920 to Jean (née Craig) (1886–1929) and Andrew MacPherson (1888–1946), a company secretary. She had two younger sisters, Agnes Jean and Margaret, and an elder brother, Andrew MacPherson, a flying officer for the RAF who was awarded the first DFC of the Second World War in 1939.

She attended school at Bearsden Academy, going on to study medicine at the University of Glasgow during the Second World War, graduating in 1943.

Career
After qualifying she served in the Royal Army Medical Corps, rising to the rank of captain. She completed her training at Glasgow Royal Infirmary and Western General Hospital. She worked in Sheffield and Edinburgh before moving to Aberdeen in 1958 with her husband when he took up the position of Regius Professor of Materia medica at the University of Aberdeen.

In 1960 Macgregor became a research assistant in Sir Dugald Baird's department of midwifery and gynaecology at the University and worked with his team to establishing a trial screening programme for cervical cancer. Macgregor took exfoliated cell smears using the Papanicolaou stain, interpreted them, and trained the team in the technique. In 1963, she received an MD by thesis for her work. In an article in the British Medical journal co-authored by Macgregor and Baird they stated that cervical cytology has now passed beyond the experimental stage' and that cervical cancer could largely be prevented by cytological detection and treatment of a pre-invasive stage. Having seen the effects of cervical cancer in practice Macgregor took the findings of research and put them into practice, encouraging women to undergo screening. She spoke with general practitioners, convincing them that their patients should be screened. She and the team at the University kept careful records of the screenings, and she collaborated with statisticians to evaluate the effectiveness of screening. Within 5 years of the screen servicing being established there was a significant decrease in cervical cancer in the Aberdeen area. Such was the success of the programme in Aberdeen that it led to cervical screening services being introduced throughout the UK. The research and programme were recognised worldwide, leading to the development of cervical screening all over the world.

Macgregor retired from the University of Aberdeen in 1985. She continued to work part-time as Director of Harris Birthright Research Centre in Aberdeen.

Macgregor always suspected that cervical cancer was caused by and infection, and during her lifetime human papillomavirus was found to be the agent. The vaccine for the virus was announced on the same day that she died.

Awards and honours 
Macgregor received several awards and honours in recognition for her work.
 Fellowship of the International Academy of Cytology, 1963
 President of British Society for Clinical Cytology, 1981–1983
 Fellowship of the Royal College of Pathologists, 1982
 OBE,1984
 Fellowship of the Royal College of Obstetricians and Gynaecologists, 1986

Personal life 
She met her husband Alastair Goold Macgregor (1919–1972) while they were students at university. They married at University of Glasgow chapel on 3 October 1944, and together they had four children, one daughter and three sons.

She retired to Isle of Seil. She died of cerebrovascular disease on 8 October 2005 at the Lynn of Lorne Nursing Home, Benderloch, near Oban.

References 

1920 births
2005 deaths
20th-century Scottish medical doctors
20th-century women physicians
Cancer researchers
Cell biologists
Scottish women medical doctors
Medical doctors from Glasgow
Alumni of the University of Glasgow
Officers of the Order of the British Empire
Academics of the University of Aberdeen
Fellows of the Royal College of Pathologists
Fellows of the Royal College of Obstetricians and Gynaecologists
20th-century Scottish women